Mark Coggins is the Choctaw and American author of a series of novels featuring private eye protagonist August Riordan. He is also a photographer.

Biography 
Coggins was born in New Mexico in 1957 and attended Stanford University, where he earned an
undergraduate degree in International Relations, a masters in Computer Science and was elected to the 
Phi Beta Kappa Society. He is an enrolled member of the Choctaw Nation.

While at Stanford, Coggins took creative writing classes with Tobias Wolff and Ron Hansen and wrote
the first short story featuring August Riordan in a class for Hansen. This was published in 1986 in The New Black Mask,
a revival of the famous Black Mask pulp magazine that launched the careers of Dashiell Hammett 
and Raymond Chandler.

Coggins has worked in the Silicon Valley for such companies as Hewlett Packard and Netscape and although
Riordan as a character is something of a technophobe, Coggins' novels often explore high technology themes and
Silicon Valley culture.

Career 
Coggins' first book, The Immortal Game, dealt with the theft of chess-playing software similar to that run
on Deep Blue and was nominated for the Shamus Award and the Barry Award. Runoff described a fictional mayoral election in San Francisco where the results were altered by individuals who hacked the city's electronic voting machines. The Big Wake-Up envisioned an altered version of the bizarre history of the peripatetic remains of Argentina's most famous first lady, Eva Perón, and won the Gold Medal in the Independent Publisher Book Awards in the Mystery/Suspense/Thriller category.

Prom Night and Other Man-made Disasters was somewhat of a departure. A collection of humorous essays describing episodes in his life from school, career, and relationships, it features a number of anecdotes from his childhood in Phoenix, Arizona, including the title essay, "Prom Night," the improbable story of how shy and socially-awkward Coggins brought the homecoming queen of Central High School to the senior prom.

Works

Novels 
 The Immortal Game (1999). 
 Vulture Capital (2002). 
 Candy From Strangers (2006). 
 Runoff (2007). 
 The Big Wake-Up (2009). 
 No Hard Feelings (2015). 
 The Dead Beat Scroll (2019).

Non-fiction 
 Prom Night and Other Man-made Disasters (2012).

Photography Monographs 
 Street Stories (2021).

External links
Official site
Review of The Immortal Game in the San Francisco Chronicle
Podcast of the first chapter of Candy from Strangers from KQED-FM

References

1957 births
20th-century American male writers
20th-century American novelists
21st-century American male writers
21st-century American novelists
American male novelists
American mystery writers
Choctaw Nation of Oklahoma people
Living people
Native American novelists
Stanford University alumni
Writers from California
20th-century Native Americans
21st-century Native Americans